is the north-eastern terminus of the Nishitetsu Kaizuka Line and the Fukuoka City Subway Hakozaki Line in Higashi-ku, Fukuoka, Japan. Its subway station's symbol mark is a brown conch which because Kaizuka's initials Chinese character  means seashell and spiral is suggestive of  transportation's junction.

The subway line coming from the city center terminates at this station and the Nishitetsu train line continues to Nishitetsu Kashii Station and Nishitetsu Shingū Station.

External links

 Fukuoka City Subway station information 
 Nishitetsu station information 

Fukuoka City Subway
Hakozaki Line
Railway stations in Fukuoka Prefecture
Railway stations in Japan opened in 1950